is a graphic adventure game developed and published by Enix. A sequel, Jesus II, was released on the PC-8801, PC-9801, and X68000 in 1991.

The game's name refers to a space station called J.E.S.U.S., named after the central Christian figure Jesus. The ship is shaped like a double-edged sword a la Book of Revelation. Its inhabitants go on to fight a mysterious demonic alien from Halley's Comet.

Plot

The game takes place in 2061. Halley's Comet has been approaching Mars for quite some time, and the nations of Earth send a mission to investigate the comet as some form of life has been detected inside the gas of it.

Musou Hayao is stationed on the space lab Jesus. He speaks with his commanding officer on the station, who requests that he track down the members of the two crews being sent to the comet and give them the access cards they would be using on the spaceships. Hayao meets with 7 different crew members during this time: the Chinese doctor, German captain, Soviet captain, American xenobiologist, French mathematician, Italian computer engineer, and Brazilian astronomer. The mathematician is also Hayao's love interest, Eline. They share a heartfelt goodbye, as they would be boarding different ships for the mission which depart two weeks apart from another, with Eline's ship leaving for the comet first. Eline happens to be a talented musician as well as a mathematician, and plays him a song that she wrote before he leaves.

After meeting all of the crew, it cuts to after Hayao's ship has arrived at Halley's comet. Hayao is sent to investigate the first ship and finds most of the crew missing. Eline's intelligent robot pet, Fojii, is found in the ship's docking bay, and after updating its data offers Hayao assistance in tracking down the missing crew members. Unfortunately, many are found dead or just beginning to die, whispering dire but vague warnings to Hayao about something else on board. A crew member tells Hayao that fire cannot hurt "it". None of the dead crew display any physical signs of harm except for a small pinprick on one of their fingers.

Hayao collects the key cards of the missing and murdered crew to access journal entries and video recordings showing a xenomorph-like creature attacking those on the ship. Recordings also say that Eline fled the alien creature and hid, giving Hayao hope that she may still be alive on the ship. While investigating for Eline, Hayao and Fojii eventually come face-to-face with the monster, at first fleeing because they have no way of harming it, but eventually attacking it with a freeze gun looted from an armory on the 4th floor of the ship. They do not manage to kill it, only slowing its movements to ensure that it cannot chase after them.

Eline is soon found hiding in one of the engine rooms, and Hayao reunites with her, asking what happened before he arrived. He tells Eline that the crew has died and they make plans to use the shuttlepods to escape the spaceship. The shuttles can only take one passenger, so Eline uses the first shuttle, with Hayao following shortly after. Before he leaves he encounters the alien monster once more, and it leaves behind a piece of its skin or body. Hayao contacts the xenobiologist, who requests he bring back the sample for further study.

Back on the first ship, the xenobiologist (Carson) begins research into the alien monster, but soon enough the "sample" of the monster breaks free and hides on the ship. Hayao and Carson suspect that the alien is able to regrow itself from the sample, much like a worm when cut in half. While searching the ship for clues, Hayao discovers happenings eerily reminiscent of the second ship's previous crew: the doctor's cryogenic pod has been used when only she should have access to it, and the astronomer's favourite food (hamburgers) is found littered in one of the storage bays. In a briefing room, a tape recording of Eline's song can be found, and it starts playing randomly over the comms as the player explores the ship only to abruptly stop. Upon returning to the room, the tape containing Eline's song is crushed. Suddenly, Carson is attacked by the monster and is missing, presumably dead. Hayao's commanding officer from the Jesus arrives to aid in capturing and killing the monster at any costs. Hayao and Eline board the commander's vessel and they plan their next attempt to locate and ultimately destroy the monster.

Carson manages to send a signal from the first ship, and Hayao goes back to investigate. However, upon returning to the commander's vessel, the monster has also boarded the ship, and breaks out of a nearby vent. Hayao and Eline manage to escape due to the commander's sacrifice - he closes the door behind him, pushing the two out to safety on the primary ship. They hide in the cryo-pods, fearful of the alien's next moves. Hayao finds a way to communicate with Jesus in Carson's pod, as Carson hooked up his pod's comm system to the main labs. In the midst of sending a distress call to Jesus, the alien monster - now more evolved - begins to speak to them in a strange language. Eline notes that the language sounds like many human languages mangled together, and Fojii begins decrypting the speech until they are able to communicate with it. The alien's speech is a combination of Chinese, German, Russian, English, Italian, and Portuguese - making it clear that the alien has taken knowledge and memories from each of the crew members that it killed, using the DNA it stole from their bodies to evolve.

The monster informs Hayao that it has taken control of the ship and plans to head for Jesus in order to conquer mankind, killing them for the sake of advanced evolution. The alien mentions that it is no longer harmed by Hayao's freeze rays, as shown in some earlier confrontations with it developing a resistance. Hayao and Eline try bargaining with the alien to no avail, until Hayao bluffs and claims that he has a remote detonator he will use to destroy the ship if the alien does not meet with them. They lure the alien further into the ship while considering their options and searching for some sort of weapon that can harm it. Fojii helps Hayao recall what happened when the tape of Eline's song started playing - the monster was the one who crushed the tape, finding the harmony unbearable to its foreign biology. He takes Eline's synthesizer and confronts the alien in front of an airlock, then plays Eline's song. The monster is disabled long enough for Hayao to jettison the creature out into space, but not before hearing - telepathically - the voices of all the crew members that were killed. They tell Hayao and Eline that their memories live on inside the alien creature and they are one and the same being now, although they are long gone. They assure the two that humanity will have the strength to fight this new breed of monster even if it returns in an attempt to destroy mankind some day, which they suspect it will. Hayao and Eline hold one another on the ship for a while, staring into the void of space, knowing that they will have to tell the tales of their fallen colleagues and prepare Earth for a future confrontation when Halley's comet returns.

Gameplay
The game proceeds as a linear adventure game in which the player chooses an action and what to perform the action on. These actions vary based on the room and situation.

Although the game implies some danger at various points, it does not seem to be possible to lose.

There are three main sections of the game, although the first section is mostly an introduction to the other characters of it.

Presentation
The game is largely presented in an anime style. Although most of the art is in a fairly bright, positive style in the first section of the game, that changes in the other sections with the atmosphere of the game and the music.

The game's music was composed by Koichi Sugiyama of Dragon Quest fame. The overworld theme from Dragon Quest, another game by Enix, is present in the PC-8801 version of the game.

Sequel 
A sequel titled Jesus II (ジーザス2 Jīzasu Tsū) was released in 1991 on the NEC PC-8801, PC-9801 and X68000 home computers.

References

 

1987 video games
Adventure games
Enix games
Square Enix franchises
FM-7 games
Fiction set in the 2060s
Video games set in the 2060s
Fiction about Halley's Comet
MSX2 games
NEC PC-8801 games
Nintendo Entertainment System games
Sharp X1 games
Video games scored by Koichi Sugiyama
Japan-exclusive video games
Video games developed in Japan
Chunsoft games
Single-player video games
Visual novels
Science fiction video games